David Wade Sullivan (born April 29, 1977) is an American film and television actor.

Early life
David Wade Sullivan was born in Tyler, Texas on April 29, 1977. He grew up in Longview, Texas, and attended Spring Hill Schools, where he graduated in 1996. He went on to attend Baylor University and majored in marketing and corporate communications, graduating in 2000. During college, he was a member of Delta Tau Delta fraternity, and played one year of football and two years of soccer.

Career
Sullivan starred as Abe in the 2004 independent film Primer, which won the Grand Jury Prize at the 2004 Sundance Film Festival. Sullivan was nominated for the Film Independent Spirit Award for Best Debut Performance at the 2004 Film Independent Spirit Awards ceremony. The movie was filmed in Dallas in 2001, but spent two years in editing and post-production. Since the debut of Primer, Sullivan moved to Los Angeles to pursue a career as an actor. In August 2010, he filmed the independent comedy-drama, Ben Banks. Sullivan also had a small part in the 2012 film Argo as Jon Titterton.

He has appeared in several television shows including Joey, Justified, Big Love, Boston Legal and CSI: Crime Scene Investigation. In 2015, Sullivan joined the cast of ABC's crime drama series Wicked City as Detective Arnold "Arnie" Bukowski, a crass, loudmouth detective in charge of heading up the ongoing investigation of a Sunset Strip serial killer. He also appeared as Dennis in the Netflix original series Flaked, opposite Will Arnett, which premiered in 2016.

Filmography

Film

Television

References

External links

Sullivan's biography on the Primer official website

1977 births
21st-century American male actors
Living people
American male film actors
American male television actors
Baylor University alumni
People from Tyler, Texas
Male actors from Texas